Kristijan Toshevski (born 6 May 1994) is a Macedonian footballer who plays for KF Tirana as a right back.

Playing career

International career
Toshevski has been part of the Macedonia national under-21 football team since 2013 and has been capped 3 times. On 28 March 2017, he also made his debut for the senior national team in a friendly match against Belarus, which ended in a 3–0 victory for Macedonia. As of May 2020, has earned a total of 8 caps, scoring no goals.

Honours

Club
Teteks
Macedonian Football Cup
Winner: 2012–13
Runner-up: 2014–15
Macedonian Super Cup
Runner-up: 2013

Pelister
Macedonian Football Cup
Winner: 2016–17

Tirana
 Abissnet Superiore 
Winner:2021–22
 Albanian Supercup
Winner:2022
Runner-up: 2020

References

External links
Profile at Macedonian Football 
 
 

1994 births
Living people
Sportspeople from Tetovo
Association football fullbacks
Macedonian footballers
North Macedonia youth international footballers
North Macedonia international footballers
FK Teteks players
FK Pelister players
FK Vardar players
Macedonian First Football League players